Sir John Arundell of Bideford (1392–1423), was an English knight who inherited large estates in Cornwall from his father, John Arundell of Lanherne. He was Sheriff of Cornwall, as was his father before him.

Career
He was appointed by Henry of Monmouth, Prince of Wales, as Sheriff of Cornwall in 1412, was Member of Parliament for Devon in 1414, and for Cornwall in 1419–1421

Marriage and issue
He was married by 1417, to Margaret Burghersh (circa 1376–circa 1421), the widow of Sir John Grenville. She was the daughter and coheir of Sir John Burghersh of Ewelme, Oxon 
 John Arundell (1421–1473) who married, 1 Elizabeth Morley and 2 Katherine Chideocke.

See also

 Arundell family

References

1392 births
1423 deaths
English MPs November 1414
English MPs 1419
English MPs December 1421
English MPs 1422
English knights
Members of the Parliament of England (pre-1707) for Cornwall
Members of the Parliament of England (pre-1707) for Devon
High Sheriffs of Cornwall
John (1392)
15th-century English landowners
Politicians from Bideford